Husain AHZ Al-Musallam (born 19 May 1960 in Kuwait) is the present Director General of Olympic Council of Asia and Secretary General of Kuwait Olympic Committee. He is a former aeroplane pilot.

Early life and career
Mussallam was born on 19 May 1960 in Kuwait.

He joined the swimming club of Kazma Sports Club at the age of 8 and became a member of the national team at 13. Between 1974 and 1976, he competed in all Pan-Arab, Asian and World Swimming Championships.

In 1978 he joined Kuwait Airways Corporation as a co-pilot and promoted to airline captain in 1988. He worked as a training and check captain since 1994.

He joined the Olympic Council of Asia on 25 December 1982, and became Deputy Director General and Technical Director in December 1998. He joined the OCA Executive Board on 23 January 2003. He is serving as the Director General since September 2005.

In February 2019, he received an Honorary Degree Of Doctor Of Philosophy, Honoris Causa in Sports Science from Kookmin University.

In 2015 he was elected as First Vice President of International Swimming Federation (FINA).

On 30 June 2019 he was elected as the Secretary General of Kuwait Olympic Committee.

Controversy

Implication in FIFA bribery scandal 
In May 2017, The Times identified Hussain Al-Musallam as "co-conspirator #3" in a US Department of Justice indictment of Richard Lai, a former member of FIFA's Audit and Compliance Committee and head of the Guam Football Association. In his guilty plea, Richard Lai admitted to accepting $750,000 in wire transfers from accounts controlled by "co-conspirator #3 or his assistants.  The OCA, in a written statement to The Times, denied the allegations and "asked the OCA ethics committee to carry out a full review."

U.S. Department of Justice investigation 
In September 2021, the Associated Press reported that Sheikh Ahmed Al-Fahad Al-Sabah and Hussain Al-Musallam have been targeted by the U.S. Department of Justice for suspected racketeering and bribery related to FIFA and international soccer politics. According to the AP, in 2017, the US embassy in Kuwait formally requested evidence from the country, including bank account information for the two officials, who have been identified as potential co-conspirators. American prosecutors "told their Kuwaiti counterparts they wanted to establish if the suspects made other payments to [Richard] Lai, or if their accounts were used to wire possible bribe payments to other soccer officials."

References 

Olympic Council of Asia
Living people
1960 births